Little Miss Perfect is an American reality television series.

Little Miss Perfect may also refer to:

Little Miss Perfect (film), a 2016 American drama
"Little Miss Perfect", a song by Sugababes from the album Sweet 7
"Little Miss Perfect" (song), a song by Summer Matthews
"Little Miss Perfect", a song by Joriah Kwamé featuring Taylor Louderman